Steinmann is a German surname meaning "stone man". Notable people with the surname include:

Adelheid Steinmann (1866–1925), German politician, women's rights activist and wife of Gustav Steinmann
Andrew Steinmann (born 1954), American theologist
Danny Steinmann (1942–2012), American film director
Gijs Steinmann (born 1961), Dutch footballer
Gustav Steinmann (1856–1929), German geologist and paleontologist
Heinz Steinmann (born 1938), German footballer
Horst Steinmann (born 1934), German economist and professor
John Steinmann (1914–1987), American architect
Roger Steinmann (born 1961), Swiss film- and theater-author/producer/director, Entrepreneur
Peter Steinmann (born 1962), Swiss modern pentathlete
Rico Steinmann (born 1967), German footballer
Urs Steinmann, Swiss slalom canoeist
Ville Matti Steinmann (born 1995), German footballer
Wulf Steinmann (1930–2019), German physicist

See also
Steinman
Stoneman (surname)

German-language surnames